Igualada Cemetery or New Cemetery (Catalan: Cementiri Nou) is a cemetery in  Igualada, near Barcelona, Catalonia, Spain,  designed by the architects Enric Miralles and Carme Pinós after winning an architectural competition in 1984. Constructed between 1985 and 1994 as a replacement for the Old Cemetery (Catalan: "Cementiri Vell"), the cemetery became widely regarded as one of the most poetic works of twentieth century Catalan architecture. Enric Miralles, who died in the year 2000 is buried in one of the tombs.

Architectural concept
Miralles and Pinós were concerned, not just to design a cemetery, but to explore poetic ideas regarding the acceptance of the cycle of life to enable a link between the past, the present, and the future.

The project is conceived, in part, as an earthwork that transforms the surrounding landscape and also, in part, as a metaphor for the river of life. A processional "street" descends from the entrance, where crossed, rusting, steel poles doubling as gates and likened to the crosses at Calvary, proclaim the start of a winding pathway towards the burial area. The route is lined with repeatable concrete loculi forming retaining walls and the floor of the path has railway sleepers set into its concrete surface. The intention was to bring the bereaved down into the landscape to a 'city of the dead', an in between place where the dead and the living are brought closer together. The spaces are designed to provoke thoughts and memories.

Critique and influence
Zabalbeascoa sees Miralles's work in general, and the cemetery in particular, as being architecture "which 'naturally' adapts itself to a given site" but cannot be termed simply organic architecture. His work is "more than simply interpreting the programme [brief] or observing a site's geographical landscape, however attentively, his architecture explores pre-existing traces in the cultural landscape of each project." The cemetery can thus be considered as architecture of the land that involves a humanisation of the brief and appreciation of the topography - that is, the visible, physical land as well as the memories contained within it. This is seen by Zabalbeascoa in contrast to the particular form of critical regionalism which prevailed in the Spanish architectural scene of the 1970s which had tended towards a more sentimental or scenographic type of architecture.

Notes

References

External links

 
 
 Architecture of time – Enric Miralles
 Book synopsis
 Powerpoint analysis 
 

Cemeteries in Catalonia
Buildings and structures completed in 1994
Enric Miralles buildings
Igualada